The following television stations operate on virtual channel 63 in the United States:

 KBEH in Oxnard, California
 WBEC-TV in Boca Raton, Florida
 WHSG-TV in Monroe, Georgia
 WIPX-TV in Bloomington, Indiana
 WKTC in Sumter, South Carolina
 WMBC-TV in Newton, New Jersey
 WYTU-LD in Milwaukee, Wisconsin

References

63 virtual